The FIA WTCR Race of Bahrain was a round of the World Touring Car Cup, which was held at the Bahrain International Circuit in Sakhir, Bahrain. The race ran as the penultimate race of the 2022 season.

Winners

References

Bahrain
World Touring Car Cup